Marriage of Convenience may refer to:
 Marriage of convenience
 Marriage of Convenience (1966 film), a Polish musical comedy
 Marriage of Convenience (1960 film), a British crime film

See also
 Marriage for Convenience a 1919 silent film drama